Triptych is a 2013 Canadian drama film directed by Robert Lepage and Pedro Pires. Adapted from Lepage's theatrical play Lipsynch, the film centres on Michelle (Lise Castonguay), a woman who has just been released from the hospital following a diagnosis with schizophrenia, and her sister Marie (Frédérike Bédard), a singer and actress who is herself recovering from brain surgery that has left her temporarily unable to speak.

The film had its theatrical premiere on 6 September 2013 at the 2013 Toronto International Film Festival, and was later shown in the Panorama section of the 64th Berlin International Film Festival.

The film received two Canadian Screen Award nominations at the 2nd Canadian Screen Awards in 2014, for Best Director (Lepage, Pires) and Best Adapted Screenplay (Lepage), and four Jutra Award nominations at the 16th Jutra Awards, for Best Director (Lepage, Pires), Best Actress (Castonguay), Best Art Direction (Jean Babin, Christian Légaré and David Pelletier) and Best Costume Design (Judy Jonker).

Cast
 Frédérike Bédard as Marie Lavallée
 Lise Castonguay as Michelle Lavallée
  as Thomas Bruckner
 Rebecca Blankenship as Ada Weber
 Aube Foglia as Whispering
 Marie-Ginette Guay as Social worker
 Michel Nadeau as Psychiatrist
 Eliot Laprise as Guillaume

References

External links
 

2013 films
2013 drama films
Canadian drama films
Films directed by Robert Lepage
Films directed by Pedro Pires
French-language Canadian films
2010s Canadian films